Carlos Octavio "Junior" Palacios Salazar (born 26 July 1996) is a Colombian professional footballer who plays for Union Omaha in USL League One.

Career

Amateur
In the 2010s, Palacios played amateur soccer for multiple teams across Florida. In 2016, he played five regular season matches for Fort Lauderdale Strikers U-23 during the team's first and only season in the National Premier Soccer League. He played for NPSL side Boca Raton FC in 2018, making his debut in the season opener against Miami United FC and getting sent off in the 75th minute. The following year, he played with the Florida Soccer Soldiers during the 2020 U.S. Open Cup qualification tournament's second round in a losing effort to Miami United FC's U-23 team.

Professional
On 5 January 2021, Palacios signed a professional contract with Miami FC of the USL Championship after spending 2020 as a trialist with the team. He made his first appearance as a second half substitute on 8 May against Hartford Athletic.

On January 31, 2023, it was announced that Palacios had signed with Union Omaha of USL League One.

Career Statistics

References

External links
 
 Boca Raton FC player page

1996 births
Living people
Colombian footballers
Colombian expatriate footballers
Colombian expatriate sportspeople in the United States
Expatriate soccer players in the United States
Association football defenders
Association football midfielders
Miami FC players
Union Omaha players
United Premier Soccer League players
National Premier Soccer League players
USL Championship players
Footballers from Cali